Sotirya is a village near Sliven, Bulgaria.

References

Villages in Sliven Province